Khashshab may refer to:
Khashshab, Iran
Ibn al-Khashshab (disambiguation)